Henderson Alexander Gall,  (born 1 October 1927) is a Scottish journalist, author, and former ITN news presenter whose career as a journalist has spanned more than 50 years.

Life and career
Gall was born in Penang, Straits Settlements (present-day Malaysia), where his father was a rubber planter. Gall was educated in Scotland at Trinity College (Glenalmond College), a boys' independent school in Glenalmond in Perth and Kinross, where he boarded. 

Gall retired from ITN in 1992, but has continued television work and writing. He became the World Affairs Expert on LBC radio in 2003. His daughter, Carlotta Gall, is also a journalist.

Awards
Gall was awarded the Sitara-e-Pakistan in 1985 and the Lawrence of Arabia Memorial Medal in 1986. He was appointed Commander of the Order of the British Empire (CBE) in 1987. He was appointed Companion of the Order of St Michael and St George (CMG) in the 2011 New Year Honours for services to the people of Afghanistan.

Bibliography
 Afghan Napoleon. The Life of Ahmad Shah Massoud (2021), Haus Publishing, 
 The Bushmen of Southern Africa: Slaughter of the Innocent (July 2001), with Charles, Prince of Wales, Chatto and Windus, 
 News From The Front: A Television Reporter's Life (Feb 1994), William Heinemann, 
 George Adamson: Lord of the Lions (Nov 1991), Grafton, 
 Afghanistan: Travels with the Mujahideen (July 1989), New English Library Ltd, 
 Salang (May 1989), The Bodley Head Ltd, 
 Afghanistan: Agony of a Nation (Feb 1988), with Margaret Thatcher, The Bodley Head Ltd, 
 Behind Russian Lines: An Afghan Journal (Sep 1983), Sidg. & J, 
 Don't Worry About the Money Now (March 1983), H Hamilton, 
 Chasing the Dragon (June 1981), Wm Collins & Sons & Co, 
 Gold Scoop (October 1977), Collins,

Film documentary
 George Adamson: Lord of the Lions – Produced by Nick Gray and Sandy Gall. In 1989 Sandy Gall visited conservationist George Adamson, of Born Free fame, in Kenya, East Africa, to discuss his past, his motivation and his life among his lion friends.

Articles

References

External links
Sandy Gall's Afghanistan Appeal
 Clip on YouTube of Sandy Gall on an LST going up the Pearl River to Hue, in 1968
Imperial War Museum Interview from 2006
Sandy Gall CV at PFD

1927 births
Alumni of the University of Aberdeen
British male journalists
Companions of the Order of St Michael and St George
Commanders of the Order of the British Empire
ITN newsreaders and journalists
Living people
People educated at Glenalmond College
People from Penang
People from Penshurst
People of the Vietnam War
Rectors of the University of Aberdeen
Scottish journalists
British expatriates in Malaysia